The Phanes coins, so called for the name inscribed on them, are early electrum coins from Caria in Asia Minor and are the most ancient inscribed coin series at present known.

Coins
The Phanes coins are a series of electrum coins issued in seven denominations: stater, 1/3, 1/6, 1/12, 1/24, 1/48, and 1/96 stater.  The staters weigh 14.1 grams.  All of the coins have the image of a stag or part of a stag on them.  The coins were likely struck at Ephesus.

The stater and 1/3 stater coins from this series both bear Greek inscriptions. The inscriptions are written right-to-left, and the letters are the mirror image of standard Greek letters. This may be translated as "I am the badge/mark/symbol of Phanes" or "I am the sign of the bright one".

The coins of Phanes are amongst the earliest of Greek coins. One, a hemihekte (a twelfth stater) of the issue, was found in a jar in the foundations of the Temple of Artemis at Ephesus dated to the late seventh century BC, making that the earliest known hoard of coins.  Only six specimens of the stater are known.

Identity of Phanes

Phanes cannot be identified with certainty. He might have been the successful mercenary Phanes of Halicarnassus, described by Herodotus as serving first the Egyptian pharaoh Amasis II and then the Persian king Cambyses II in his invasion of Egypt. The coins might be associated with the primeval god Phanes, whose name means "light" or "shine", or that might have been an epithet of the local goddess identified with Artemis. Barclay V. Head found those suggestions unlikely and thought it more probably "the name of some prominent citizen of Ephesus".

Notes

References

Coins of ancient Greece
Caria
Coin designers